Percy Bady is an American singer, keyboardist, arranger, songwriter and record producer.

Biography
Bady was involved in 26 platinum and gold records. In 2003, he released his first solo album, The Percy Bady Experience, which reached No. 22 on the Top Gospel Albums.

In 2012, Bady signed a record deal with Marantha! Music. In 2013, he released his second solo album, Kingdom Inspirations, which charted No. 17 on the Top Gospel Albums and No. 35 on the Top Heatseekers. His single "I Won't Give Up" charted No. 22 the same year. In 2014, he gained a Grammy Award nomination for his song "Still" (feat. Lowell Pye) in the category 'Best Gospel Song'.

Awards

 1999: GMA Dove Award - (Won)
 2008: Stellar Award  - 'Song Of The Year' (Nomination)
 2014: Grammy Award - "Still" for 'Best Gospel Song' (Nomination)

Discography
 2003 - The Percy Bady Experience
 2013 - Kingdom Inspirations

References

External links
Allmusic.com Allmusic
Percy Bady Interview NAMM Oral History Library (2017)

Year of birth missing (living people)
Living people
American keyboardists
American gospel singers
American male singers
American record producers